The 1909 Wisconsin Badgers football team represented the University of Wisconsin as a member of the Western Conference during the 1909 college football season. Led by second-year head coach Thomas A. Barry, the Badgers compiled an overall record of 3–1–1 with a mark of 2–1–1 in conference play, placing fourth in the Western Conference. The team's captain was John Wilce.

Schedule

References

Wisconsin
Wisconsin Badgers football seasons
Wisconsin Badgers football